Sapp Plantation is a historic plantation located outside of Sardis, Georgia. It was added to the National Register of Historic Places on February 8, 1980, and is located northwest of Sardis on Georgia 24.

Its plantation house was built in the 1820s with mortise-and-tenon construction.  It is a two-story building with one-story additions.

See also
National Register of Historic Places listings in Burke County, Georgia

References

External links
Sapp Family National Libation Ceremony, 8/3/2012 Uploaded on Feb 9, 2012 YouTube (event was to be held at the Sapp Plantation in Burke Country Georgia 8/3/2012)

Plantations in Georgia (U.S. state)
Houses on the National Register of Historic Places in Georgia (U.S. state)